Trivento is a comune (municipality) and Catholic episcopal see in the Province of Campobasso in the southern Italian region Molise, located about  northwest of Campobasso.

Trivento borders the following municipalities: Castelguidone, Castelmauro, Civitacampomarano, Lucito, Roccavivara, Salcito, San Biase, Sant'Angelo Limosano and Schiavi di Abruzzo.

Its church of  Ss. Nazario, Celso e Vittore, dedicated to St. Nazarius, St. Celsus and St. Victor, is the cathedral episcopal see of the Roman Catholic Diocese of Trivento.

References

External links
 Official website
 Associazione Turistica PRO LOCO Trivento
 GCatholic - cathedral

Cities and towns in Molise